The Royal Danish Academy of Fine Arts, School of Design, more commonly known as the Danish Design School (Danish: Danmarks Designskole. often abbreviated as DKDS) is an institution of higher education in Copenhagen, Denmark, offering a five-year design education consisting of a three-year Bachelor programme and a two-year Master in design as well as conducting research within the fields of arts, crafts and design. Danmarks Designskole is an institution under the Ministry of Science, Innovation and Higher Education.

History

The Danish Design School traces its roots back to the foundation of the Tegne- og Kunstindustriskolen (English: Arts and Crafts School) in 1875. Upon a merger in 1930, the school changed its name to Kunsthåndværkerskolen (The School of Arts and Crafts) and after several further mergers with other schools it changed its name to Danmarks Designskole (The Danish Design School) in 1991 and moved into the former main building of the Finsen Institute at Strandboulevarden. It changed from being an independent institution to functioning under the auspices of the Ministry of Culture.

In 2007 - 2009, it hosted the Copenhagen Institute of Interaction Design, a postgraduate school and consultancy which focuses on the area of Interaction Design.

In 2011 the school was merged with the School of Architecture and the School of Conservation, both part of the Royal Danish Academy of Fine Arts, and officially changed its name to The Royal Danish Academy of Fine Arts - The School of Design, being recognized as an institution of higher education under the Ministry of Science, Innovation and Higher Education, instead of as a cultural institution filed under the Ministry of Culture. The Design School also moved to a new campus on Holmen in Copenhagen due to the merger.

Location

In 2011 The Danish Design School moved from its old campus at the Finsens Institute in Østerbro to Philip de Langes Allé on Holmen in central Copenhagen, where it was integrated in the creative campus there, alongside educational institutions such as the Danish Film School and the School of Architecture.

Education
The educational programme spans 5 years, divided into a 3-year bachelor programme and a 2-year master programme. Specializations currently on offer include fashion design, digital interaction, industrial design, ceramics and glass design, furniture and spatial design, production design, textile design, game design, and visual communication. The school carries out both basic as well as practice based and applied research, and is a member of the Danish national Center for Design Research.
In 2010 the school merged with the Glass and Ceramic School on The Island of Bornholm, and is now offering a three-year programme in ceramic and glass.

Alumni
 Poul Kjærholm
 Ole Wanscher
 Børge Mogensen
 Hans Wegner
 Nanna Ditzel
 Jacob Jensen
 Kasper Salto
 Louise Campbell
 Cecilie Manz
 Baum und Pferdgarten
 Mads Kjøller Damkjær
 
 Peter Jensen (fashion designer)
 Hans Christensen (silversmith)

References

External links

 
 Copenhagen Institute of Interaction Design

Design schools
Danmarks Designskole
Higher education in Copenhagen
1875 establishments in Denmark
Educational institutions established in 1875